The Council for the Protection of Struggle and Martyrdom Sites is a Polish government body charged with the preservation of historical sites of wartime persecution of the Polish nation. It was set up by Act of Parliament on 2 July 1947 and, since 1988, is under the direct responsibility of the Prime Minister's Office.

Aims and objectives
The Council's tasks include providing logistical help to museums of fight and martyrdom and offering consultation and advice to leading Polish museums of World War II in particular Auschwitz-Birkenau, Majdanek, Treblinka, Stutthof, Stalag Łambinowice, Żabikowo Fort VII, Gross-Rosen in Rogoźnica, and Radogoszcz station and museum. The Council is responsible for scheduling and organizing celebrations, exhibitions and publishing projects, as well as popularizing in mass media the historical facts, figures and notable persons associated with the struggle for freedom and wartime martyrdom of the nation. The Council is also in charge of assessing the current state of the sites of national memory, the public monuments, cemeteries, and mass graves of victims of Nazi and Soviet terror, and places of battles, including their commemoration initiatives.

Chairmen of the Council 
Members of the Council are appointed by the Prime Minister for four-year terms.

 1947–1953 – Zygmunt Balicki 
 1954–1960 – Kazimierz Banach 
 1960–1981 – Janusz Wieczorek
 1982–1983 – Stanisław Marcinkowski 
 1984–1985 – Wacław Jagas 
 1985–1990 – Roman Paszkowski
 1990–2000 – Stanisław Broniewski 
 2001–2015 – Władysław Bartoszewski 
 2016 – Anna Maria Anders

See also
Office for War Veterans and Victims of Oppression

References

External links
 Official site 

Government agencies of Poland
Poland in World War II
1947 establishments in Poland